The following events took place during 1911 in Belgium.

Incumbents
Monarch: Albert I
Prime Minister: Frans Schollaert (to 17 June); Charles de Broqueville (from 17 June)

Events

 8 June – Frans Schollaert tenders his resignation as prime minister due to the failure of his government's proposed education bill.
 17 June – Charles de Broqueville succeeds Frans Schollaert as prime minister.
 20-27 August – World Esperanto Congress in Antwerp
 30 October – First Solvay Conference convenes, chaired by Hendrik Lorentz.

Balance of trade
 Total imports: USD 870,135,289.
 Total exports: USD 691,007,550.

Publications
Periodicals
 Annales de l'Académie Royale d'Archéologie de Belgique, 63
 L'Expansion belge, vol. 4.

Books
 Demetrius Charles Boulger, Belgium of the Belgians (London, I. Pitman)
 Pierre Broodcoorens, La mer: Légende lyrique en quatre parties (Brussels, Éditions de la Belgique artistique & littéraire)
 George Wharton Edwards, Some Old Flemish Towns (New York, Moffat, Yard & co.)
 Clive Holland, The Belgians at Home (London, Methuen)
 Benjamin Linnig, La gravure en Belgique; ou, Notices biographiques sur les graveurs anversois, bruxellois et autres, depuis les origines de la gravure jusqu'à la fin du XVIIIe siècle (Antwerp, Janssens)
 Henri Pirenne, Histoire de Belgique, vol. 4.
 J.-H. Rosny, La Guerre du feu.
 Emile Vandervelde, Le Belgique et le Congo
 Émile Verhaeren, Les Heures du Soir; Les Plaines

Births
 11 January – Pierre Caille, sculptor (died 1996)
 16 March – Pierre Harmel, politician (died 2009)
 14 May – Jean Borremans, politician (died 1968)
 17 May – Albéric O'Kelly de Galway, chess grandmaster (died 1980)
 26 November – Raymond Scheyven, politician (died 1987)

Deaths
 3 January – Jean Pierre François Lamorinière (born 1828), painter
 30 January – Léon Van Den Bossche (born 1841), diplomat
 18 April – Edmond Lefever (born 1839), sculptor
 8 October – Marie Collart (born 1842), painter

References

 
1900s in Belgium
Belgium
Belgium
Years of the 20th century in Belgium